2-Nitrotoluene or ortho-nitrotoluene is an organic compound with the formula CH3C6H4NO2.  It is pale yellow liquid that crystallizes in two forms, called α (−9.27 °C) and β (−3.17 °C).  It is mainly a precursor to o-toluidine, which is an intermediate in the production of various dyes.

Synthesis and reactions
It is made by nitrating toluene at above -10 °C.  This reaction affords a 2:1 mixture of 2-nitro and 4-nitro isomers.

Chlorination of 2-nitrotoluene gives two isomers of the chloronitrotoluenes.  Similarly nitration gives two isomers of dinitrotoluene.

2-Nitrotoluene is mainly consumed in the production of o-toluidine, a precursor to dyes.

References

External links
CDC - NIOSH Pocket Guide to Chemical Hazards -  o-Nitrotoluene

Nitrotoluenes